Coming to America is a 1988 comedy film starring Eddie Murphy and James Earl Jones.

Coming to America may also refer to:
 "Coming to America" (The System song), a 1988 song from the film of the same name
 "America" (Neil Diamond song), a 1981 pop song
 Coming to America (TV pilot), a 1989 television pilot based on the 1988 film
 Victoria Beckham: Coming to America, a 2007 American television series
 Coming 2 America, a 2021 sequel to the 1988 film